FIM Moto2 European Championship is a motorcycle racing competition intended for young racers in Europe. This competition is organized by Dorna, which also runs the competition MotoGP, and Superbike World Championship.

Moto2 was initially a 600 cc four-stroke class. Engines were supplied exclusively by Honda, tires by Dunlop and electronics are limited and supplied only by FIM-sanctioned producers. Carbon brake discs are banned, only steel brake discs are allowed. However, there are no chassis limitations.

The championship was scheduled to switch to Triumph engines in 2020, following the switch of the Moto2 World Championship in 2019. However the switch was postponed for 2020 and 2021 to reduce costs due to the ongoing COVID-19 pandemic. The championship switched to Triumph engines in 2022.

Sponsor
 Finetwork
 HRC
 Dell'Orto
 Dunlop
 Prosecco Doc
 Hawkers
 Bridgestone

Champions

References

 motorcycle sport
Sport in Europe
Motorcycle road racing series